63rd NYFCC Awards
announced: December 11, 1997given: January 4, 1998

Best Picture:
 L.A. Confidential
The 63rd New York Film Critics Circle Awards, honoring the best in film for 1997, were announced on 11 December 1997 and given on 4 January 1998.

Winners
Best Actor: 
Peter Fonda - Ulee's Gold
Runners-up: Ian Holm - The Sweet Hereafter and Robert Duvall - The Apostle
Best Actress:
Julie Christie - Afterglow
Runners-up: Helena Bonham Carter - The Wings of the Dove and Judi Dench - Mrs Brown
Best Cinematography: 
Roger Deakins - Kundun
Best Director: 
Curtis Hanson - L.A. Confidential
Runner-up: Atom Egoyan - The Sweet Hereafter
Best Documentary Film:
Fast, Cheap & Out of Control
Best Film: 
L.A. Confidential
Runners-up: The Sweet Hereafter and Titanic
Best First Film: 
Neil LaBute - In the Company of Men
Best Foreign Language Film: 
Ponette • France
Runners-up: Shall We Dance? (Shall we dansu?) • Japan, Underground • France/Germany/FR Yugoslavia and Ma Vie en Rose • France/Belgium/UK
Best Screenplay: 
Curtis Hanson and Brian Helgeland - L.A. Confidential
Best Supporting Actor:
Burt Reynolds - Boogie Nights
Best Supporting Actress: 
Joan Cusack - In & Out

References

External links
1997 Awards

1997
New York Film Critics Circle Awards
1997 in American cinema
New York
1997 in New York City